Erin Fitzgerald is a Canadian voice actress who provides voice-overs for a number of cartoons, video games and English language dubs of Japanese anime. In animation, she voices Raven Queen in Ever After High and C.A. Cupid in both Monster High and Ever After High. In addition, she voiced Spectra Vondergeist and Scarah Screams among others in the Monster High series.

Biography
Fitzgerald was born in Victoria, British Columbia and graduated from the University of Victoria with a Bachelor of Fine Arts, with an acting specialization. She moved to Vancouver and worked with local theater groups doing plays, radio plays, television, and film. Her voice-over career began with loops groups in Vancouver for shows such as The Outer Limits, she worked in looping for six years.  Fitzgerald moved to Los Angeles in 2000. While in LA she regularly works with a Christmas charity called Combat Radio.

Career 
She had her first start in voice acting as Piranha Mae Hoover in Fat Dog Mendoza while in Vancouver. Her first major animated role was as Nazz and May Kanker in the long-running Cartoon Network series Ed, Edd n Eddy. After seeing how she would be a regular on the show she would move to Los Angeles for more opportunities. She has had roles in other cartoons such as Sabrina: The Animated Series, The Jungle Bunch to the Rescue, Fat Dog Mendoza, Monster High, A.T.O.M., Dragon Tales and Rainbow Fish. In 2012, she replaced Tracey Rooney as the voice for Chie Satonaka in the Persona 4 series.

Fitzgerald would provide various voices for fashion doll franchises such as the 2010 web series Monster High and Ever After High  in 2013.

Her current roles include Ask the StoryBots, which has won 5 Daytime Emmy Awards and 16 nominations including winning 2 Annie Awards, as Bo and various other characters as well as lending her singing voice for Let's Go Luna! as Luna.

She also does theater work where she would do one-woman shows such as The Wizard of Oz.

Selected filmography

Animation

Anime

Animated films

Video games

Live-action voice-over

Live action

Notes

References

 Book references

External links
 
 
 
 

Living people
Actresses from Los Angeles
Actresses from Vancouver
Actresses from Victoria, British Columbia
Canadian emigrants to the United States
Canadian film actresses
Canadian television actresses
Canadian video game actresses
Canadian voice actresses
Canadian LGBT actors
Pansexual actresses
University of Victoria alumni
Year of birth missing (living people)
20th-century Canadian actresses
21st-century Canadian actresses
21st-century Canadian LGBT people
20th-century Canadian LGBT people